Kasper Sand Kjær (born 4 May 1989 in Randers) is a Danish politician, who is a member of the Folketing for the Social Democrats political party. He was elected into parliament in the 2019 Danish general election.

Kjær was elected into parliament in the 2019 election, where he received 3,065 personal votes.

References

External links 
 Biography on the website of the Danish Parliament (Folketinget)

Living people
1989 births
People from Randers
Social Democrats (Denmark) politicians
Members of the Folketing 2019–2022
Members of the Folketing 2022–2026